The 2019 Malaysia FA Cup (also known as Shopee Malaysia FA Cup for sponsorship reasons) was the 30th edition of the Malaysia FA Cup, a knockout competition for Malaysia's state football association and clubs. The winners were assured a place for the 2020 AFC Champions League preliminary round 2.

59 teams entered the competition.

Qualified teams
The following teams are qualified for the competition. Reserve teams are excluded.

Round and draw dates

Preliminary 
Key: (1) = Liga Super; (2) = Liga Premier; (3) = Liga M3; (4) = Liga M4

The draw for the preliminary round was held on 9 February 2019 at 17:00 involving 38 teams from Liga M3 and Liga M4. JBFA and MD Besut received bye into the First Round. Eighteen matches took place from 16 to 17 February 2019.

First round
The draw for the first round was held on 18 February 2019 at 14:00 involving JBFA, MD Besut and 18 teams that progressed from preliminary round. Ten matches took place from 2 to 3 March 2019.

Second round
The draw for the second round was held on 4 March 2019 at 15:00 involving 12 teams from Liga Super, 9 teams from Liga Premier and 10 teams that progressed from first round. Fourteen matches took place from 2 to 3 April 2019. Postponed match between PDRM and Sarawak will be held on 9 April 2019. Johor Darul Ta'zim received bye into the Third Round.

Third round
The draw for the third round was held on 4 April 2019 at 15:00 involving 17 teams (1 byes, 14 won, and 2 that yet to be played on the day of the draw) that progressed from second round. Eight matches took place from 16 to 17 April 2019.

Quarter-finals
The draw for the quarter-finals onward to final was held on 18 April 2019 at 15:00 involving 8 teams that progressed from third round. The first legs were played on 30 April and 1 May, and the second legs were played on 10 and 11 May 2019.

Bracket

Summary
|-

|}

Matches

Pahang won 5−2 on aggregate. 

Perak won 2−1 on aggregate. 

Kedah won 4−2 on aggregate. 

3–3 on aggregate. Felda United won on away goals.

Semi-finals
The first legs were played on 22 June, and the second legs were played on 29 and 30 June 2019.

Summary
|-

|}

Matches

Perak won 4−3 on aggregate. 

3−3 on aggregate. Kedah won on away goals

Final

Top goalscorers

See also 
 2019 Malaysia Super League
 2019 Malaysia Premier League
 2019 Malaysia M3 League

References

External links
 Football Malaysia LLP website - Piala FA
 Result Reports 

Piala FA seasons
Malaysia
FA Cup